Borgolai Grant No.11 is a census town in Tinsukia district  in the state of Assam, India.

Demographics
 India census, Borgolai Grant No.11 had a population of 5034. Males constitute 52% of the population and females 48%. Borgolai Grant No.11 has an average literacy rate of 66%, higher than the national average of 59.5%; with male literacy of 75% and female literacy of 56%. 11% of the population is under 6 years of age.

References

Cities and towns in Tinsukia district
Tinsukia